Bettina Stangneth (born 1966) is a German philosopher. Known for her work on antisemitism and National Socialism, she is the author of several books, including Eichmann Before Jerusalem (2014), which won an NDR Kultur Sachbuchpreis (non-fiction book award) in 2011 when it was first published in German.

Stangneth was awarded her PhD by the University of Hamburg in 1997 for a thesis on Immanuel Kant.

Selected works

 (2000). Kultur der Aufrichtigkeit: Zum systematischen Ort von Kants Religion innerhalb der Grenzen der bloßen Vernunft. Würzburg: Königshausen & Neumann. 
 (2003). Die Religion innerhalb der Grenzen der bloßen Vernunft/Immanuel Kant. Hamburg: Meiner. 
 (2011). Eichmann vor Jerusalem: Das unbehelligte Leben eines Massenmörders. Zürich: Arche. 
 (2014). Eichmann before Jerusalem: The Unexamined Life of a Mass Murderer. New York: Alfred A. Knopf. 
 (2012). Lüge! Alles Lüge! Aufzeichnungen des Eichmann-Verhörers Avner Werner Less. Zürich: Arche. 
 (2016). Böses Denken. Reinbek: Rowohlt. 
 (2017). Lügen lesen. Reinbek: Rowohlt. 
 (2019). Hässliches Sehen. Reinbek: Rowohlt. 
 (2020). Sexkultur. Reinbek: Rowohlt.

References

Further reading
Evans, Richard J. (17 October 2014). "Eichmann Before Jerusalem: The Unexamined Life of a Mass Murderer – review. The Guardian.

1966 births
Living people
20th-century German philosophers
21st-century German philosophers
German women philosophers
University of Hamburg alumni
20th-century German women
21st-century German women